Evgenii Vyacheslavovich Lukantsov (born 5 December 1991) is a Russian canoeist. He competed in the K-1 200 m event at the 2016 Summer Olympics, but failed to reach the final.

Lukantsov has a degree from the Ryazan State Radio Engineering University and later studied sports disciplines at the Southern Federal University. He took up kayaking in 2007 in Ryazan following his elder brother.

References

External links

 

1991 births
Living people
Russian male canoeists
Olympic canoeists of Russia
Canoeists at the 2016 Summer Olympics
ICF Canoe Sprint World Championships medalists in kayak
Sportspeople from Irkutsk
European Games competitors for Russia
Canoeists at the 2015 European Games
Canoeists at the 2019 European Games
Canoeists at the 2020 Summer Olympics